May Win Maung is a Myanmar Academy Award-winning Burmese actress. She debuted in 1973 with the film Hla Chin Yet Sak Sak Yo, directed by U Chit Sein (Shumawa). She has acted in over 60 films.

May won her first Best actress Myanmar Academy Award in 1980 with the film Kyi Pyar (ကြည်ပြာ).

Awards and nominations

References

Living people
20th-century Burmese actresses
Year of birth missing (living people)
Burmese film actresses